David Collings (4 June 1940 – 23 March 2020) was an English actor. In an extensive career he appeared in many roles on stage, television, film and radio, as well as various audio books, voiceovers, concert readings and other work. He garnered a following through his numerous appearances in cult sci-fi series such as Doctor Who, Sapphire & Steel and Blake's 7, as well as dubbing the titular character in the series Monkey and Legolas in the classic BBC Radio 4 adaptation of Tolkien's The Lord of the Rings.

Biography
Collings was born in Brighton on 4 June 1940.

Film and television
Collings's screen breakthrough came playing the protagonist Raskolnikov in Fyodor Dostoyevsky's Crime & Punishment (1964 with Associated-Rediffusion Television). The production was broadcast live. He has played historical characters such as Percy Grainger in Ken Russell's Song of Summer (1968), Richard Simmons in The Shadow of the Tower (1972), John Ruskin in The Love School (1975), a BBC series about the Pre-Raphaelites, and Sir Anthony Babington in Elizabeth R. In 1975, he portrayed William Wilberforce in The Fight Against Slavery, and he starred as William Pitt in Prince Regent in 1979.

Collings also appeared as Deva in the final episode of Blake's 7 and as the character of 'Silver' in several of the popular Sapphire & Steel TV adventures. He appeared in the TV series Danger Man, Mystery and Imagination, UFO (episode "The Psychobombs") and Gideon's Way; in the latter, he played an emotionally disturbed man attacking young women in the episode The Prowler.

Collings played the character of Bob Cratchit in the classic 1970 film musical, Scrooge, starring alongside Albert Finney, Dame Edith Evans, Sir Alec Guinness, Kenneth More, Anton Rodgers and others. In 1981 he played the dual roles of Lord Dark and The Friendly Ghost in the perennial school-children's favourite Dark Towers, part of the Look and Read series. He voiced the eponymous lead for the long-running hit Japanese television series Journey to the West, released in English-speaking countries as Monkey. The show was a popular hit and had a mass following, particularly with young people. He is also noted for his children's television appearances including the role of Julian Oakapple in Midnight is a Place (1977). In 1989 he played Charn (the villain) in Through The Dragon's Eye, and had a recurring role as the headmaster in Press Gang from 1989 to 1993.

Doctor Who
He has appeared a number of times in the long-running British science fiction television series Doctor Who, including Vorus in Revenge of the Cybermen, Poul in The Robots of Death and Mawdryn in the serial Mawdryn Undead. He has also played an alternate Doctor in the audio plays by Big Finish Productions in the Doctor Who Unbound series, Full Fathom Five, alongside other Doctor Who audio credits. Collings returned to the role of Poul- now named Paulus- in the episode Hidden Persuaders of the audio drama series Kaldor City.

Radio
On radio, he portrayed Legolas in the classic BBC Radio 4 adaptation of The Lord of the Rings.

He was Mr Carlyle in Radio 4's 7-episode serial dramatisation of East Lynne by Mrs Henry Wood, first broadcast in June 1987.

In 2006, Collings was the reader of the critically acclaimed recordings of The Complete Ghost Stories of M. R. James.

Theatre
Collings was described by The Stage as a "stalwart of the National and RSC". His career on stage began with seasons at the Liverpool Rep and subsequently took him all over the world with leading companies including Cheek by Jowl, as well as BAM and the Lincoln Center in New York.

He has had a long theatre career appearing in various productions in the UK, US and globally, ranging from Shakespeare and his contemporaries, classical works, Restoration dramas and farce, through to contemporary classics and new plays. He played the parts of Mortimer the Elder and Matrevis in a production of Edward II at the Royal Exchange, Manchester, which also featured his son, the actor Samuel Collings. He also appeared as the King of France in Henry V, and most recently Giles Corey in The Crucible at the same venue.

Personal life
Collings had three children, Samuel, Eliza and Kate.

He died aged 79, on 23 March 2020.

Filmography

References

External links 
 

1940 births
2020 deaths
English male film actors
English male Shakespearean actors
English male stage actors
English male television actors
English male voice actors
People from Brighton
Place of death missing
Royal Shakespeare Company members